The Buckhorn Trail is an eleven-mile loop in the North Unit of Theodore Roosevelt National Park, North Dakota. The trail begins and ends in a parking lot directly across from the North Unit Campground.  Free permits are available for backcountry camping upon arrival.

External links

Hiking trails in North Dakota